An abode or dwelling is a self-contained unit of accommodation used by one or more households as a home.

Abode may also refer to:
House, a human-built dwelling with enclosing walls, a floor, and a roof
Right of abode
World of Two Moons aka Abode, a fictional Earth-type planet featured in the comic book Elfquest